Big Brother 22, also known as Big Brother: All-Stars, is the twenty-second season of the television reality program Big Brother. The season premiered on August 5, 2020, and is broadcast on CBS in the United States and simulcast on Global in Canada. Julie Chen Moonves is hosting the season. For the first time since Big Brother: Over the Top, the program featured a live premiere. CBS renewed Big Brother for an additional season on September 5, 2019, before the twenty-first season concluded and confirmed Chen Moonves would be returning as host. The start of the season was delayed six weeks due to the impacts of COVID-19. Hours before the season finale, Julie Chen Moonves made an official announcement for the show's renewal for a 23rd season in 2021.

The season finale was broadcast on October 28, 2020, after 85 days of competition, where season 16 runner-up Cody Calafiore was named the winner and defeating season 12 HouseGuest Enzo Palumbo in the third unanimous final jury vote in Big Brother US history (following Dan Gheesling of Big Brother 10 and Tamar Braxton of Celebrity Big Brother 2). Da'Vonne Rogers was named the season's America's Favorite HouseGuest.

Format

Big Brother follows a group of contestants, known as HouseGuests, who live inside a custom-built house outfitted with cameras and microphones recording their every move 24 hours a day. The HouseGuests are sequestered with no contact with the outside world. During their stay, the HouseGuests share their thoughts on their day-to-day lives inside the house in a private room known as the Diary Room. Each week, the HouseGuests compete in competitions in order to win power and safety inside the house. At the start of each week, the HouseGuests compete in a Head of Household (abbreviated as "HOH") competition. The winner of the HoH competition is immune from eviction and  selects two HouseGuests to be nominated for eviction. Six HouseGuests are then selected to compete in the Power of Veto (abbreviated as "PoV") competition: the reigning HoH, the nominees, and three other HouseGuests chosen by random draw. The winner of the PoV competition has the right to either revoke the nomination of one of the nominated HouseGuests or leave them as is. If the veto winner uses this power, the HoH must immediately nominate another HouseGuest for eviction. The PoV winner is also immune from being named as the replacement nominee. On eviction night, all HouseGuests vote to evict one of the nominees, though the Head of Household and the nominees are not allowed to vote. This vote is conducted in the privacy of the Diary Room. In the event of a tie, the Head of Household casts the tie-breaking vote. The nominee with the most votes is evicted from the house. The last nine evicted HouseGuests comprise the Jury and are sequestered in a separate location following their eviction and ultimately decide the winner of the season. The Jury is only allowed to see the competitions and ceremonies that include all of the remaining HouseGuests; they are not shown any interviews or other footage that might include strategy or details regarding nominations. All evicted HouseGuests are eligible to win this award except for those who either voluntarily leave or are forcibly removed for rule violations.

This is the first season since Big Brother 14 not to hold a "Battle Back" competition.

HouseGuests

On July 23, 2020, CBS confirmed the season would be an All-Stars edition with previous HouseGuests taking part. This was the second All-Stars edition in the history of the program after the seventh season in 2006. The HouseGuests were revealed during the live season premiere on August 5, 2020.

Future appearances
In 2022, Janelle Pierzina appeared as a contestant on the USA Network reality competition series, Snake in the Grass. Enzo Palumbo and David Alexander competed on The Challenge: USA.

Episodes

Twists

Safety Suite
In the second episode, the Safety Suite twist was introduced. For each of the first three weeks, HouseGuests could opt to compete in a Safety Suite competition to earn immunity as well as immunity for one other player. Each HouseGuest could only compete in one of the three Safety Competitions by scanning the VIP Pass that was given to them on Week 1. Once the Suite was activated, those who wanted to participate would have one hour to scan in. The players who chose to participate were revealed to all the remaining HouseGuests. The player who won the Safety Suite competition would be safe for the week and would have to choose a +1 to be safe along with them, however the +1 would have to accept a unique punishment for the week in addition to the immunity.

BB Basement
During episode 13, Julie revealed a new room in the house called the BB Basement. In this room, a competition would take place that would award three game-changing powers to HouseGuests.

Neighbor’s Week
During episode 22, it was revealed that Big Brother 2 winner Will Kirby would move into the neighbor's house for the week and tempt the HouseGuests with prizes during the next HOH and veto competitions. Kirby showed up multiple times during the week to shake up the game.

Triple Eviction
For the first time in the American Big Brothers show history, a Triple Eviction occurred on Day 58, during which the HouseGuests competed in two rounds of play following the first eviction.

Voting history
Room Winner
The Room Winner refers to the special competition that took place on the Sunday episode pertaining to the new room opened in the House during that week.
 In Weeks 1–3, the room was the Safety Suite, with the winner earning immunity for the week for themselves and an additional HouseGuest of their choice, referred to as a "+1." The Safety Suite winner is denoted in bold with the respective +1 underneath.
 In Week 5, the Room was the BB Basement, with three winners each receiving a different game-changing power.

Notes

 :  Kaysar won the Safety Suite Competition, thereby winning Immunity for himself and one other player of his choice. Kaysar choose to give immunity to Janelle.
 :  Christmas won the Safety Suite Competition, thereby winning Immunity for herself and one other player of her choice. Christmas choose to give immunity to Ian.
 :  Enzo won the Safety Suite Competition, thereby winning Immunity for himself and one other player of his choice. Enzo choose to give immunity to Christmas.
 :  After the Nomination Ceremony, David privately played his Disruptor Power on himself, cancelling his nomination and granting him immunity for the week. Dani nominated Tyler in David's place.
 : Day 58 was a Triple Eviction night. Following the first eviction, the remaining HouseGuests played another two eviction cycles — HoH and Veto competitions and nomination, veto and eviction ceremonies — during the live two-hour show, culminating in both a second and third eviction for the night.
 : As Head of Household, Cody chose to evict Nicole F.
 : During the finale, the Jury voted for the winner of Big Brother: All-Stars.

Production

Impacts of COVID-19
Dates for open casting calls were announced on February 28 and were due to start on March 7. All open casting calls were cancelled on March 10 due to concerns over the COVID-19 pandemic however potential applicants were urged to continue submitting online applications. An article from The Hollywood Reporter on April 7 noted that CBS would be without new seasons of Big Brother and Love Island during the summer. Unnamed sources to the publication said the network would rely on repeats of their scripted shows that "have historically repeated well." In a May 19 interview with Deadline, CBS Entertainment President Kelly Kahl said the network was "optimistic" about airing both shows (Big Brother and Love Island) during the summer "a little later than usual." Pre-production began on July 2 with the crew starting construction on the house located in Los Angeles. Deadline reported the crew was following strict health and safety guidelines which including being tested for COVID-19, wearing personal protective equipment and observing social distancing during construction. Fly on the Wall Entertainment and Endemol Shine North America, which co-produce the series, had to wait for approvals from unions and guilds to officially begin filming. CBS revealed several changes to the program to ensure the health and safety of the HouseGuests, staff and production crew. Prior to the season premiere, the HouseGuests were placed in quarantine and tested for COVID-19 multiple times. Once inside the House, the HouseGuests would be tested weekly and have no contact with the production crew and any supplies delivered to the House would be disinfected. The production crew and staff would also be tested regularly and screened for symptoms, provided personal protective equipment and work in socially distant pods. A COVID-19 compliance officer will be on staff to ensure the implementation of the safety policies. Additionally, the live shows would not have a studio audience.

Development
CBS announced Big Brother had been renewed for a twenty-second season on September 5, 2019. Chen Moonves confirmed to return as host on the same day after signing a one-season contract extension with the network. Merchandise for the upcoming season briefly appeared on CBS' online store on July 20, 2020, featuring the title Big Brother: All-Stars with a redesigned logo. Allison Grodner and Rich Meehan will return as executive producers for the series which will be produced by Fly on the Wall Entertainment, in association with Endemol Shine North America. CBS announced the season would have a live two-hour premiere on August 5, 2020. For the first time since Big Brother: Over the Top this season will feature the HouseGuests moving into the House during live premiere. New episodes will air on Sunday/Wednesday/Thursday schedule as in previous seasons except all episodes will air in the 8:00 p.m. timeslot. Global will air the season in Canada in simulcast with CBS.

Casting
Kassting, Inc. returned to provide casting services for a 21st consecutive season since Big Brother 2, with Robyn Kass serving as the casting director. Despite the eventual "All-Stars" format, an open casting call for the season was still held, which opened on September 22, 2019, and closed on April 3, 2020.

Filming
As with previous seasons, the program is filmed at CBS Studios, soundstage 18 in Studio City, California in a custom-built two-story house. The House is equipped with 94 high-definition cameras and over 113 microphones to monitor and record the HouseGuests.

Production design
The theme of the house is a modern colorful urban loft that showcases Big Brother history. Like the previous All-Star house, the new house contains many references to past players and moments of the series. Spray-painted murals in the kitchen area depict memorable moments from popular former HouseGuests, including:
 Danielle Reyes miming devil horns in her Diary Room sessions along with her countdown towards her goal of reaching the end, "1 down, 8 to go" (from Big Brother 3).
Dan Gheesling is depicted during his infamous "funeral" (from Big Brother 14);
Will Kirby is featured and labeled as a "puppet master" (from Big Brother 2 & Big Brother 7);
Derrick Levasseur's "undercover" gameplay that alludes to his occupation as an undercover police officer (from Big Brother 16);
Rachel Reilly's popular battlecry of "Floaters, [you better] grab a life vest" (from Big Brother 12); and
 Kaycee Clark is featured with her frequently vocalized catchphrase "Let's go!" (from Big Brother 20).
The lounge features toss pillows of the show's multiple popular "showmances," including Jeff/Jordan (from Big Brother 11 and Big Brother 13), Cody/Jessica (from Big Brother 19), Brendon/Rachel (from Big Brother 12 and Big Brother 13), Dominic/Daniele (from Big Brother 13), Swaggy C/Bayleigh (from Big Brother 20), Tyler/Angela (from Big Brother 20), and Victor/Nicole (from Big Brother 18). The first bedroom is a comic themed room that alludes to the recurring Power of Veto competition BB Comics. The walls of this room includes images of the BB Comics characters of multiple past HouseGuests, including Victor Arroyo (of Big Brother 18), Amber Borzotra (of Big Brother 16), Frank Eudy (of Big Brother 14 and Big Brother 18), Jessica Graf (of Big Brother 19), Frankie Grande (of Big Brother 16), Ovi Kabir (of Big Brother 21), Jordan Lloyd (of Big Brother 11 & Big Brother 13), Steve Moses (of Big Brother 17), Rachel Reilly (of Big Brother 12 and Big Brother 13), Vanessa Rousso (of Big Brother 17), Angela Rummans (of Big Brother 20), Faysal Shafaat (of Big Brother 20), Devin Shepherd (of Big Brother 16), Christopher "Swaggy C" Williams (of Big Brother 20) and Jase Wirey (of Big Brother 5 and Big Brother 7). The second bedroom is themed around cameras, the walls of this bedroom is filled with "127 black-and-white photos that highlight pivotal moments spanning the show’s 20-year history". The third bedroom is themed around the Big Brother key, the symbol of safety in the Big Brother house as used in the nomination ceremony and in the Final 2 jury vote. The bathroom features rubber ducks which have been frequently seen in the pool. This season also featured an updated front of house studio for the first time since Big Brother 15, featuring a new 10-foot-tall entrance door as well as a hallway to prevent houseguests from peeking beyond the door, a trope that has caught on in recent years.

Reception

Controversy and criticism
During Week 5, Memphis Garrett, Nicole Franzel, Dani Briones, and Christmas Abbott made fun of Ian Terry's rocking coping mechanism for being on the autism spectrum. Dani stated, "I can't even look at him sometimes because [of] his constant movement. It stresses me out. I feel mean saying that, but I'll literally have to move." Memphis and Christmas joined in, with Memphis comparing Ian's demeanor to that of a horror movie. Multiple houseguests were also involved in the matter, including Cody Calafiore and Enzo Palumbo. These houseguests laughed when comments were made, but did not directly make comments about Terry.

Viewing figures

United States

 : Episode 2 was delayed to 10:07 PM ET (9:07 PM CT) due to the 2020 PGA Championship golf event running long.
 : Episode 18 was moved to Tuesday, September 15 due to the 55th Academy of Country Music Awards being rescheduled from April due to the impacts of COVID-19.
 : Episode 20 was delayed to 8:50 PM ET (7:50 PM CT) due to the Kansas City Chiefs-Los Angeles Chargers game running long.

Canada

References

External links
  – official American site
  – official Canadian site
 

2020 American television seasons
22
Television productions postponed due to the COVID-19 pandemic